Brett Robert Wallerstedt (born November 24, 1970) is a former American football linebacker. He played in the National Football League (NFL) for the Phoenix Cardinals in 1993, the Cincinnati Bengals from 1994 to 1995 and for the St. Louis Rams in 1997 in addition to a short offseason stint with the Denver Broncos in 1994. He played college football at Arizona State.

References

1970 births
Living people
American football linebackers
Arizona State Sun Devils football players
Phoenix Cardinals players
Cincinnati Bengals players
St. Louis Rams players